The 1995 Metro Atlantic Athletic Conference baseball tournament took place from May 12 through 14, 1995. The top two regular season finishers of the league's two divisions met in the double-elimination tournament held at Heritage Park in Colonie, New York.  won their first tournament championship and advanced to the play-in round for the right to play in the 1995 NCAA Division I baseball tournament.

Seeding 
The top two teams from each division were seeded based on their conference winning percentage. They then played a double-elimination tournament.

Results

All-Tournament Team 
The following players were named to the All-Tournament Team.

Most Valuable Player 
P. J. Buonocore was named Tournament Most Valuable Player.

References 

Tournament
Metro Atlantic Athletic Conference Baseball Tournament
Metro Atlantic Athletic Conference baseball tournament